Philipp Waeffler (born 14 August 1971) is a Swiss modern pentathlete. He competed in the men's individual event at the 1996 Summer Olympics.

References

External links
 

1971 births
Living people
Swiss male modern pentathletes
Olympic modern pentathletes of Switzerland
Modern pentathletes at the 1996 Summer Olympics
People from Schaffhausen
Sportspeople from the canton of Schaffhausen